Da Key is the third studio album by American rapper Frayser Boy. It was released on May 20, 2008 via Hypnotize Minds, with distribution from Select-O-Hits. The album was named Da Key after Frayser Boy won an Oscar for writing the song "It's Hard out Here for a Pimp" for the film Hustle & Flow and was presented with The Key to the City of Memphis, Tennessee for his achievement. The album was recorded in only three days in early 2008.

Track listing

Personnel 
Cedric Coleman – main artist
Paul Duane Beauregard – featured artist, producer
Jordan Michael Houston – featured artist, producer
Blake Franklin – artwork and design

Chart history

References 

2008 albums
Frayser Boy albums
Albums produced by DJ Paul
Albums produced by Juicy J